William Nelson  (circa 1462–1525) was one of two Members of the Parliament of England for the constituency of York on four consecutive terms between 1504 and 1523.

Life and politics
William was born about 1462 as the second son of Thomas Nelson, a former lord mayor of York. He followed his father into being a merchant and became a freeman of the city in 1488. He traded in lead from Richmondshire and it alleged he was also a money lender. After his father's death, he inherited his properties in Poppleton, Riccall and Sherburn. He added lands near Acaster Malbis in 1503. His property dealings brought him into dispute with Sir John Gillot, who was mayor at the time, in 1503 to the extent he was fined for his threatening behaviour. He held the civic offices of senior chamberlain (1489–90, sheriff (1495–96), alderman (1499–1517) and mayor (1500–01). 

Though he actually lost the election to parliament in 1515, he was requested by Henry VIII to stand in place of those that had been chosen. His terms in parliament were interrupted by several disturbances and riots in the city which caused him to be sent back. 

He married Joan Norton and they had at least three sons and 3 daughters. He died in 1525.

References

Members of the Parliament of England for constituencies in Yorkshire